The Kaohsiung Park is a park in Siaogang District, Kaohsiung, Taiwan.

Transportation 
The park is accessible within walking distance south east of Kaohsiung International Airport Station of Kaohsiung MRT.

See also 
 List of parks in Taiwan

References 

Parks in Kaohsiung